TRPM is a family of transient receptor potential ion channels (M standing for wikt:melastatin).  Functional TRPM channels are believed to form tetramers. The TRPM family consists of eight different channels, TRPM1–TRPM8.

Unlike the TRPC and TRPV sub-families, TRPM subunits do not contain N-terminal ankyrin repeat motifs but, rather, contain entire functional proteins in their C-termini. TRPM6 and TRPM7, for example, contain functional α-kinase segments, which are a type of serine/threonine-specific protein kinase.

Permeability and activation
The relative permeability of calcium and magnesium varies widely among TRPM channels. 
TRPM4 and TRPM5 are impermeable to calcium.
TRPM3, TRPM6 and TRPM7 are highly permeable to both calcium and magnesium.

The mechanism of activation also varies greatly among TRPM channels. 
TRPM2 is activated by ADP-ribose adenosine 5'-diphosphoribose and functions as a sensor of redox status in cells.
TRPM4 and TRPM5 are activated by intracellular calcium.
TRPM8 can be activated by low temperatures, menthol, eucalyptol and icilin.

Functions
Among the functional responsibilities of the TRPM channels are:
regulation of calcium oscillations after T cell activation and prevention of cardiac conduction disorders (TRPM4).
modulation of insulin secretion and sensory transduction in taste cells  (TRPM5).
cold sensation (TRPM8).
heat sensation and inflammatory pain (TRPM3).
regulation of magnesium reabsorption in the kidneys and absorption in the intestines (TRPM6).
regulation of cell adhesion (TRPM7).

Genes
TRPM1, TRPM2, TRPM3, TRPM4, TRPM5, TRPM6, TRPM7, TRPM8

References

External links

 

Membrane proteins
Ion channels